Reginald Allen Patterson (born November 7, 1958), is a retired professional baseball player who was a pitcher in the Major Leagues.

Career
Patterson was signed by the Chicago White Sox as an amateur free agent in June 1979. He made his MLB debut in 1981 for the Chicago White Sox shortly after the settlement of the baseball strike. In his debut on August 13, he was the starting pitcher facing the Boston Red Sox at Fenway Park, but lasted only 1 innings surrendering 6 runs on 6 hits (including a 2-run home run to Carl Yastrzemski) en route to a 9–6 loss. He failed make the Major League roster in 1982, spending the season with the Edmonton Trappers in the Triple-A Pacific Coast League. After the season, he was traded to the Chicago Cubs for Tye Waller.

Patterson played for the Chicago Cubs organization for the next three seasons (1983–1985) splitting his time between the Major Leagues (as a September call-up) and the Iowa Cubs in the Triple-A American Association. On September 8, 1985, Pete Rose hit his 4,191st hit against Patterson with a single in the first inning of a Reds' 5–5 called game against Chicago, which according to independent research, was actually the hit that broke the all-time hits record. On March 31, 1986, he was released by the Cubs.

Patterson finished his professional career pitching for the Tecolotes de los Dos Laredos in the Mexican League in 1986. In between, he played winter ball in the Dominican Republic, Puerto Rico and Venezuela.

References

External links

Pura Pelota (Venezuelan Winter League)

1958 births
Living people
African-American baseball players
Águilas del Zulia players
American expatriate baseball players in Canada
American expatriate baseball players in Mexico
Appleton Foxes players
Cangrejeros de Santurce (baseball) players
Chicago Cubs players
Chicago White Sox players
Edmonton Trappers players
Glens Falls White Sox players
Iowa Cubs players
Knoxville Sox players
Liga de Béisbol Profesional Roberto Clemente pitchers
Major League Baseball pitchers
Mexican League baseball pitchers
Navegantes del Magallanes players
American expatriate baseball players in Venezuela
Niagara Falls Pirates players
Baseball players from Birmingham, Alabama
Tecolotes de los Dos Laredos players
Tiburones de La Guaira players
Tigres del Licey players
American expatriate baseball players in the Dominican Republic
21st-century African-American people
20th-century African-American sportspeople